Nicola Celon (born: 8 Februari 1964 Verona) is a sailor from Italy, who represented his country at the 2000 Summer Olympics in Sydney, Australia as helmsman in the Soling. With crew members Daniele De Luca and Michele Paoletti they took the 148th place.

References

1964 births
Living people
Sailors at the 2000 Summer Olympics – Soling
Olympic sailors of Italy
Sportspeople from Verona
Italian male sailors (sport)